Munich International Airport- Franz Josef Strauß  is an international airport serving Munich and Upper Bavaria. It is the second-busiest airport in Germany in terms of passenger traffic after Frankfurt Airport, and the ninth-busiest airport in Europe, handling 47.9 million passengers in 2019. It is the world's 15th-busiest airport in terms of international passenger traffic, and was the 38th-busiest airport worldwide in 2018. It serves as hub for Lufthansa including its subsidiaries Lufthansa CityLine, Air Dolomiti and Eurowings as well as a base for Condor and TUI fly Deutschland.

It is named after former Bavarian minister-president Franz Josef Strauss. It has two passenger terminals with an additional midfield terminal, two runways as well as extensive cargo and maintenance facilities and is fully equipped to handle wide-body aircraft including the Airbus A380.

History

Development

Munich's previous airport, Munich-Riem Airport, was operational from 1939 to 1992. Initial plans for an expansion of the airport date back to the year 1954. With rising passenger numbers and a growing number of inhabitants in its proximity, plans were made to completely move the airport to another site. The Bavarian government took the decision to build a new airport in the area called "Erdinger Moos" on 5 August 1969. When construction started on 3 November 1980, the small village of Franzheim disappeared and its approximately 400 inhabitants were resettled. The airport is located on the territory of four different municipalities: Oberding (location of the terminals; district of Erding), Hallbergmoos, Freising, and Marzling in the district of Freising.

The new Munich airport commenced operations on 17 May 1992, and all flights to and from Munich were moved to the new site overnight. Munich-Riem closed on 16 May 1992 shortly before midnight.

The airport is named after Franz Josef Strauss, who played a prominent, albeit sometimes controversial, role in West German politics from the 1950s until his death in 1988. Amongst other positions, Strauss was a long-time Minister-President (Governor) of the state of Bavaria. Strauss, a private pilot himself, initiated the new airport project and was particularly interested in attracting the aviation industry to Bavaria. He is regarded as one of the fathers of the Airbus project and served as initial chairman of the Airbus supervisory board.

Flughafen München GmbH, which owns and operates Munich Airport, is a limited liability company consisting of three shareholders: the State of Bavaria (51%), the Federal Republic of Germany (26%) and the City of Munich (23%). The logo of Munich Airport consists of the letter "M" with the slogan "Living ideas – Connecting lives". Munich Airport is usually referred to as "Flughafen München" or simply "MUC", its IATA code. During construction, the airport was referred to as "Flughafen München II".

Operations
As their home base at Frankfurt Airport suffered from capacity limits back then, Lufthansa established a second hub offering several short- and long-haul connections through Munich in addition to Frankfurt. While Lufthansa serves more European destinations from Munich Airport than from Frankfurt Airport, Frankfurt has many more intercontinental routes.

Between 1995 and 2006, passenger numbers doubled from under 15 million per annum to over 30 million, despite the impact of the 11 September attacks in 2001 and 2002. In 1996 the airport overtook Düsseldorf as Germany's second-busiest airport and currently handles almost twice as many passengers as the country's third-busiest airport.

In June 2003, construction of Terminal 2 was completed and it was inaugurated as an exclusive facility for Lufthansa and its Star Alliance partners.

In November 2013, the airport introduced its first new corporate design since its inauguration. The large letter 'M' remains in a new font type, and a dash has been added which changes between several colors. There are also animated color-changing versions of the 'M'-sign placed throughout the airport area, for example on the main entrance road and on the new Terminal 2 satellite.

In June 2015, Condor announced it intends to establish a long-haul base at Munich Airport from the 2016 summer season. Condor has already based short- and mid-haul operations at the airport and resumed long-haul flights in winter 2013 after a six-year absence. In November 2015, Transavia announced their intention to establish their first German base at Munich Airport which will consist of four aircraft serving 18 new routes by spring 2016. As of June 2015, the biggest foreign carrier in Munich in terms of passenger numbers is Air Dolomiti.

More than 40 million passengers passed through the airport in 2015, a record at the time.

In December 2016, Lufthansa's low-cost subsidiary Eurowings announced that it would establish a major base at Munich Airport from March 2017, with 32 new routes. These new base operations was carried out by Air Berlin on a new wet-lease contract with Eurowings. In February 2017, Transavia announced the closure of their entire base at Munich Airport by October 2017 after only a year of service due to a change in their business strategy and negative economic outlook.

Munich Airport's dynamic growth continued in 2018 with new traffic records and an all-time high of 46.2 million passengers. The airport also saw a strong surge in take-offs and landings, with 413,000 movements, an increase of 2.2% in 2018. With 266 destinations Munich Airport increased its global network and is among the leading air transportation hubs in Europe.

In February 2021, Lufthansa announced it would take over most of Eurowings's routes in Munich with the exception of few domestic services and flights to Palma de Mallorca and Pristina.

Terminals and facilities
Most of the airport's facilities are located in the area between the two runways. The approach road and railway divide the west part into a southern half, which contains cargo and maintenance facilities, and a northern half, which contains mostly administrative buildings and service facilities, a holiday long-term parking lot and the visitors' centre. It is followed by the west apron and Terminal 1, then the Munich Airport Center (MAC), Terminal 2 and the east apron. Munich Airport has two passenger terminals, and shuffled 20–25 million people through each terminal in 2014.

Terminal 1

Terminal 1 is the older terminal and commenced operation when the airport was opened on 17 May 1992. It has a total capacity of 25 million passengers per year and is subdivided into five modules designated A, B, C, D and E. Modules A through D provide all facilities necessary to handle departures and arrivals, including individual landside driveways and parking, whereas module E is equipped to handle arrivals only. This design essentially makes each module a self-contained sub-terminal of its own. Modules A and D are used for flights within the Schengen-area, while modules B and C handle those to destinations outside it. Hall F is separate, located near Terminal 2, and handles flights with increased security requirements, i.e. those to Israel. Furthermore, the check-in counters for some flights departing from Terminal 1 are located in the central area Z where most of the shopping and restaurant facilities of this Terminal as well as the airport's suburban railway station are also located.

The  pier features 21 jet bridges, two of which have been rebuilt into waiting halls for bus transfers. One gate position has been equipped with three jet bridges to handle the Airbus A380 which is regularly used by Emirates. There are further 60 aircraft stands on the apron, some of which are equipped with specially designed apron jet bridges, to which passengers are brought by bus. This unique concept allows passengers to board with full protection from the weather but without the high investment required for full satellite terminals connected through a passenger transport system.

Terminal 1 currently handles all airlines that are not members or partners of the Star Alliance with the exception of Turkish Airlines. However, owing to lack of capacity at Terminal 2, Lufthansa's subsidiary Germanwings and former affiliate Condor both moved back to Terminal 1 in 2007. Germanwings however moved back to Terminal 2 in late 2015. Some of the major users at Terminal 1 are Condor, Eurowings, Emirates, Qatar Airways, American Airlines, Delta Air Lines, easyJet and TUI fly Deutschland amongst several others.

Terminal 1 extension
As of December 2015, a major redesign of Terminal 1 including a capacity increase and an extension of the central terminal building to the west for centralised security and shopping facilities was under preparation. In November 2016, a major €400m extension and refurbishment for Terminal 1 was announced. Terminal areas A and B will be entirely redesigned with the addition of a  pier stretching out on the apron. The new facilities will provide capacity for 6 million additional passengers, will be able to handle 12 aircraft including two Airbus A380s at once, and were originally due to open by 2022. However, due to the sharp decrease in passenger traffic in the wake of the COVID-19 panedemic and a simultaneous sharp cost increase for the new terminal annex, the building's shell will be finished by 2022 with a new estimated opening of 2025.

Terminal 2

Terminal 2 commenced operation on 29 June 2003. It has a design capacity of 25 million passengers per year and is exclusively used by Lufthansa and all other Star Alliance members serving Munich except Turkish Airlines. Star Alliance partners Air Malta and Luxair also use Terminal 2. Etihad Airways relocated to this terminal as well after commencing a partnership with Lufthansa.

Having been designed as a hub terminal, it is not divided into modules like Terminal 1. Instead, all facilities are arranged around a central Plaza. Owing to security regulations imposed by the European Union, the terminal has been equipped with facilities to handle passengers from countries considered insecure, i.e. not implementing the same regulations. This required the construction of a new level as, unlike other airports, the terminal does not have separate areas for arriving and departing passengers. The new level 06 opened on 15 January 2009.

As the total number of 75 aircraft stands on the east apron is not always sufficient, Terminal 2 sometimes also uses parking positions on the west apron, to which passengers are carried by airside buses. Terminal 2 is able to handle the Airbus A380 as well, however, prior to the opening of the Terminal 2 satellite building, there were no designated stands or additional jet bridges for it. Lufthansa flies the A380 into the satellite building.

Terminal 2 has two main departure levels, 04 and 05 and additional bus gates on the lower level 03. Gates on level 05 (H) are designated non-Schengen gates. Until the new transfer level 06 opened, the northernmost gates were behind an additional security checkpoint for departures to the USA most of the day. The lower level 04 (G) contains Schengen gates. The bus gates on level 03 are also designated G and are also used for Schengen flights. Level 03 is smaller than the main levels and consists of two separate parts which can be reached from two points on level 04. One area of these gates is designated to Air Dolomiti.

The terminal is operated by Terminal-2-Betriebsgesellschaft (German for Terminal 2 Operating Company), which is owned by Flughafen München GmbH (60%) and Lufthansa (40%). This makes Terminal 2 the first terminal in Germany which is co-operated by an airline.

Terminal 2 Satellite

Terminal 2 was projected to reach its full capacity of handling 27.5 million passengers a year by 2013. Lufthansa and Star Alliance partners stipulated the expansion of Terminal 2 without constructing the separate facilities for luggage claim, arrival and departure levels, etc. This was to ensure the easy access for the passengers who appreciate the convenience of central plaza for checking in their luggage, going through the security screening, and such as well as transferring from one plane to other within Lufthansa and Star Alliance partner networks inside Terminal 2. After the completion of Terminal 2 in 2003, the preparations for a new satellite terminal already had been made.

The project cost is 650 million Euro with Munich Airport contributing 60% and Lufthansa 40% toward the project. The expansion would handle additional 11 million passengers per year. The construction was approved in 2010 and started in 2012. At end of 2015, the construction was completed, and the teams of volunteers performed the trial runs in January 2016 as to identify any potential issues and to streamline the movements between Terminal 2 and Terminal 2 Satellite. The satellite terminal was inaugurated on 22 April 2016 and commenced its operations on 26 April 2016.

The building has separate access facilities for Schengen and Non-Schengen passengers on two main levels (K Level for Schengen and L for Non-Schengen destinations). The J section is for bus transportation between the terminal and aircraft parked at aprons. 44 new passport control stations and 24 security lanes for transfer passengers are installed in the terminal. Five new Lufthansa lounges along with new restaurants and shops are set up throughout the terminal. However, the satellite terminal is airside-only facility: the check-in, luggage claim, departure and arrival passenger meet points are still done at Terminal 2. The passenger transportation between Terminal 2 and Terminal 2 Satellite is served by fully automated people mover by Bombardier Transportation that operates in the tunnels. The satellite terminal celebrated its one millionth passenger in July 2016, less than three months after its opening.

A future expansion of the satellite building into a 'T' shape has been planned along with a possible third terminal to the east. Lufthansa and Flughafen München GmbH (Munich Airport operator) signed a Letter of Intent on 16 December 2019 to expand Terminal 2 Satellite. The expansion will build a new terminal extending from the centre of Terminal 2 Satellite building at right angle toward the east. The Memorandum of Understanding from Flughafen München GmbH stipulates that both parties reach the goal of becoming a -neutral by 2030, utilising highly fuel-efficient aircraft. No further detail about number of gates along with construction and completion dates is given yet.

Munich Airport Center

The Munich Airport Center (MAC) is a shopping, business, and recreation area that connects the terminals. The older Central Area, which was originally built as part of Terminal 1, hosts a shopping mall and the S-Bahn station. The newer MAC Forum built with Terminal 2 is a large outdoor area with a partly transparent tent-like roof. Next to it is the airport hotel managed by Hilton Hotels & Resorts which was designed by the world-famous architect Helmut Jahn and landscape architecture firm PWP Landscape Architecture in 1994.

The Munich Airport Center has a supermarket where one can shop from 5:30 a.m. to midnight every day, including Sundays, as it is exempt from the Bavarian law governing retail hours of operation.

Runways
The airport has two parallel runways and one concrete helipad.

Parking areas

Currently, there are five parking garages and six underground parking areas, amounting together to a total of 30,000 parking spaces of which approximately 16,500 are under a roof. The parking garage P20 at Terminal 2, with 6,400 parking spaces on eleven levels (including four that are underground) since its commissioning in 2003 was the largest parking garage in Germany until the car park at the new Allianz Arena was opened in 2005. A parking guidance system was installed in the parking garages, which detects whether a parking space is occupied and newly arriving vehicles are shown where the empty parking spaces are located.

Apart from the usual parking facilities, the Munich Airport offers, at additional cost, special parking spaces with additional benefits. This includes valet parking, in which the vehicle is picked up by an airport employee upon flight departure and parked, and the Park, Sleep & Fly option, in which a night at the Hilton hotel is included. Also there is an option for oversized parking spaces, the so-called XXL parking, and secure parking. Lastly, there is a special separate parking level in the P20 parking garage, where the parked cars are guarded. In addition, special services can be booked, such as interior/exterior cleaning and fuelling.

To make shopping in the public areas more attractive for local residents of the airport area, there are special offers where visitors can park up to three hours for free in the P20 parking garage. Short-term parking can be found east of the central area, where visitors can park for free for a maximum of thirty minutes. During the holiday periods other cheaper options are provided in the P8 parking garage.

Visitor viewing facilities

The airport authorities have set out to cater for visitors and sightseers by creating a 'Visitors Park' which includes a 'Visitors Hill', from which a good view of the westerly aircraft apron and Terminal 1 can be obtained, as well as a restaurant and a shop for aircraft models and other collectors' items. This location is served by a railway station named 'Besucherpark'. The view from the hill is shown in the above widescreen image of the Terminal 1 apron. Three historic aircraft are on display in the park, a Super Constellation, a Douglas DC-3, and a Junkers Ju 52/3m.

There is also a visitors' viewing terrace on the roof of Terminal 2 that features a wide, glassed balcony with seating areas and gives a view of the easterly aircraft apron. All visitors can access the terrace from the landside. The entrance fee was abolished in September 2013. There are two additional smaller Visitor Hills on the north end of the north runway and at the center of the south runway.

Airlines and destinations

Passenger
The following airlines offer regular scheduled and charter flights at Munich Airport:

Cargo

Statistics

Annual traffic

Busiest routes

Other facilities
 Lufthansa maintains a Flight Operations Center at the airport for crews based here at its secondary hub. In 2014, its subsidiary Lufthansa CityLine relocated their administration offices from Cologne to the grounds of Munich Airport. Additionally, there is a large Lufthansa Technik maintenance facility which can handle up to six Boeing 747s at once.
 There are two hotels directly on the airports grounds, the Hilton Munich Airport (which was the Kempinski Hotel Airport Munich until 31 December 2014) near Terminal 2 and a Novotel at the long-term parking area with several more in the nearby villages.
 German car manufacturer Audi established a large training facility for its retailers on the grounds of the airport in 2010. Designated areas near the apron are used for drive training.
 The defunct German airline DBA, originally Deutsche BA, had its head office on the grounds of the airport and in Hallbergmoos.
The helicopter operations division of the Bavarian State police is based here.

Environment

Since November 2005, the Munich Airport has a certified environmental management system according to DIN ISO 14001 and EMAS.

Munich Airport was involved in the Air Transport Initiative for Germany, which was also attended by Fraport, Deutsche Flugsicherung and Lufthansa. It developed a so-called "four-pillar strategy" with an overall concept designed to improve environmental protection; these four pillars include:

"Reduction of  emissions through technological progress and innovation, particularly in the field of engine development; a more efficient infrastructure with a needs-based adaptation of airport capacity with concentration on the avoidance of, for example, polluting queues; operational measures such as the optimization of soil processes; economic incentives"
—Perspectives. Environmental Statement 2008 Munich Airport GmbH

Landscape
From the beginning, the state-administered parts of nature conservation aspects were considered in the planning of the airport. At the opening of the airport, 70% of the grounds were planted; today there are 925 of the 1,575 hectares which remained planted, only 60%. The prevalent Erdinger Moos area with its many intersecting small streams, and woodland series was taking into consideration in the planning by the landscape architect. At the same time, consideration was taken in making the airport unattractive to birds, in order to prevent bird strikes. An additional 230-acre green belt was placed around the airport as a compensation area, in which the overall compensation areas extend over 600 acres. Even with the focus on the environment, environmental groups criticize the enormous land consumption of the airport and each additional expansion project. Also, they believe that the compensation areas are not sufficient enough in order to compensate for the damage caused by the airport (see below).

Water
The construction in the Erdinger Moos area had a large impact on the water budget of the region, since the groundwater levels in the marshy landscape had to be greatly reduced by creating drainage ditches. Existing watercourses, such as small streams, were not interrupted, but redirected so that they now run either around or underneath the property, limiting the effects of groundwater reduction to only the areas in which the airport is located.

The wastewater from the airport and the collected rain water are both returned to the natural water cycle. In order to accomplish this, 100 km of sewer lines were laid, and seven pumping stations, a water treatment plant and four rainwater sedimentation tanks were built and put into operation. The already rough cleansed water is then sent to a purification plant. For the necessary winter de-icing of the airport, used deicing chemicals such as glycol are collected together with the contaminated melted water, and then either purified or reused. The cleaning is done in the degradation system area, where soil bacteria decompose the glycol into harmless components of water and carbon dioxide.

Noise
General
To reduce noise from thrust reversal during aircraft landings, the runways were built to a length of 4,000 meters, however the noise reduction is offset by increased taxiing times. To reduce noise pollution, a hall for engine testing was built. After 11 p.m. engine tests may be carried out only with the approval of air traffic control. To motivate airlines to use low-noise aircraft, the airport charges are calculated according to the level of noise pollution. There are 16 stationary noise measuring points at the airport.

Night flight regulations
At Munich airport there is no strict ban on night flights, but a ban on flights arriving and departing between 10 p.m. and 6 a.m.. The only exemptions are flights from mail services and DFS survey flights. From midnight until 5am only those flights that operate in the interest of the public are generally possible, this includes so-called emergency flights: police and rescue helicopter missions or medical emergencies. Also, aircraft movements for security reasons such as for precautionary landings are allowed at all times. Flights with special permission from the Bavarian Ministry for Economic Affairs, Infrastructure, Transport and Technology are also feasible at this time.

From 10 p.m. to midnight and 5 a.m. to 6 a.m. flights are possible through the so-called bonus list. Exceptions are delayed flights or premature landings if these aircraft are at least noise-admitted according to ICAO Chapter 3. In addition to both the bonus list and noise requirements they must fulfill further conditions, this includes that the airline must have a maintenance base at the airport, the maximum number of 28 scheduled flights per night (charter and scheduled services) must not be exceeded, the aircraft is not louder than 75 db (A) or it is an education or training flight.

This rule applies until the total annual volume is exhausted in air traffic movements by these regulations. More flights of this type are then no longer allowed. The number of night flights increased from 1999 to 2007 from 42 to 60 flights average per night.

Residents have been protesting for years against aircraft noise, in particular against the noise pollution at night. The Government of Upper Bavaria approved the night flight regulations currently in force in 2001.

Energy
Cogeneration plant
Most of Munich airport's electricity and heat is generated by its own cogeneration plant (CHP), which is located south of the northern runway to the west of the airport. CHP has nine so-called cogeneration modules, seven run on diesel fuel, the other two on gasoline. The electrical generating capacity is 18.5 megawatts. The cogeneration modules run smoothly all year long; this creates surplus heat at certain times which is stored in heat storage to be used later. In summer, the heat generated is used for the operation of the absorption refrigerating machine. The total gross utilization rate is 78 percent (diesel) and 83 percent (gasoline). The cogeneration modules are an obligation, from the Renewable Energy Sources Act, so that Munich Airport can generate electricity from renewable energy sources, using biogas. The airport also has a connection to the district heating network of the Zolling power plant.

Photovoltaic system
There is a photovoltaic system on the roof of the central hall of terminal 2. It is a joint project of BP Solar, German BP, Bundesdeutscher Arbeitskreis für Umweltbewusstes Management, Lufthansa, Munich Airport and others. In operation since 10 July 2003, it generates an average of 445,000 kilowatt hours per year, equivalent to the consumption of 155 households. The power comes from 2,856 modules of silicon cells, covering a total area of 3,594 square metres. It is expected to save 12,000 tons of carbon dioxide emissions over its 30-year lifetime. €2.65 million EUR were invested in the plant. The plant produces direct current, which after conversion to alternating current is initiated immediately in the power system. In Terminal 2, the energy currently generated is displayed on an overhead screen, which also displays other information.

Biofuel gas station
A biofuel gas station supplying rapeseed oil fuels, ethanol fuel and biomethane has been established, making it possible for the operating companies to convert their vehicle fleets to biofuels; the station can also be used by external companies operating at the airport.

Bird sanctuary
Despite measures to prevent bird strikes, the northern part of Erdinger Moos is still an important habitat for birds, especially for grassland birds such as northern lapwing, Eurasian curlew or rare winter visitors such as the hen harrier. This led automatically to the area being reported under the European Birds Directive as a bird sanctuary.

The fencing of the airport and the large meadows inside the fence attract open meadow birds. This leads to constant conflicts and the deaths, even of rare birds as a result of airplane accidents (vortices) and safety measures to avoid bird strikes. The planned third runway 3,440,000 square metres in the bird sanctuary will be laid with concrete, eliminating 8,000,000 square metres of living space. This would represent substantial interference with the bird sanctuary.

Safety

Police

For the safety of passengers and flight operations, four inspections by the Federal Police, departments of the Bavarian State Police (Police Inspection Munich Airport, PP Oberbayern Nord) and the security department of Flughafen München GmbH are responsible. The airport police station is located in Nordallee 6, and the police officers working there have an adapted qualification to the specific field of application, for example, they are also trained in the case of an aircraft hijacking. Bavaria's police helicopter squad is also based at the Munich Airport, where five of the Eurocopter EC135 helicopters are stationed. A move of the unit to Schleißheim Airport is planned for 2020.

In addition, one of the world's two chambers for explosive goods (the second one is located at Kuala Lumpur International Airport) is located on the airport grounds. In this chamber explosive substances can be defused.

Fire department

The airport has its own fire department with 32 fire engines distributed over two fire stations, which are located near the runways. They are positioned in a way that the emergency vehicles can reach every point of the apron, taxiway and runway in a maximum of three minutes, as long as no adverse weather conditions prevail. Should larger missions occur, the fire departments of the surrounding municipalities can be called in, which can provide up to 36 vehicles and about 216 men; in exchange, the airport fire department helps in large fires in the region. Most recently, this happened when a BMW plant in Eching went up in flames.

* The sum of the missions also includes other missions such as guided tours.

Ambulance service
Emergency medical care is provided by a rescue guard on Nordallee operated by the Malteser Hilfsdienst under a public service contract. A rescue vehicle is ready for use around the clock, which is also used outside the airport area for normal emergencies. If necessary, other rescue workers from the region or supraregional are used, the deployment coordination is carried out by the integrated control center which is also responsible for the area of the airport.

On the premises of the airport is an emergency physician from the medical center that arrives on the emergency site, when required, in a separate vehicle according to the rendezvous procedure.

Ground transportation

Road
Munich Airport is accessible via nearby Motorway A 92, which connects to motorway A9 (towards Nuremberg) and Munich's ring motorway A99. Bavarian State Road St. 2584 connects A 92's exit 6 (Flughafen München)—an incomplete interchange that can only be used by traffic to and from the west—to the terminals. Access from the east is possible via exit 8 (Freising Ost) and Bavarian State Road St. 2580, which connects to St. 2584 in the east of the airport.

The north-southbound so-called "Flughafentangente Ost" ( literally: airport tangential road east) between A92 and A94 was finally opened in 2010  with a single lane in each direction. Originally, it was planned to be opened as expressway quiet simultaneously with the new Airport. Gradually, the accident prone road shall be selectively upgraded from 2021 on to two alternating lanes per direction.

It can be reached by bicycle on national highway 301 ("B301") and an airport road branching from this highway into the airport area.

Suburban railway

There are two railway stations on the grounds of Munich Airport: Munich Airport Terminal station is located in a tunnel directly beneath the central area between both passenger terminals. A second station called Besucherpark (German for Visitors' Park) is located in the area that contains the cargo and maintenance areas, long-term parking, administrative buildings and the Visitors' Park from which the station gets its name.

The ride takes approximately 45 minutes to the Marienplatz station in the city centre.  runs from the airport through the northwestern suburbs and reaches the city centre from the west (Hauptbahnhof – Marienplatz – München Ost), while  comes in from the eastern suburbs passing the stations from the opposite direction. The S-Bahn from the airport to the city runs approximately 20 hours a day with a short break between 1:30 a.m. and 4 a.m.

Furthermore, a scheduled regional bus service 635 connects the airport within 20 minutes to the Freising railway station, providing access to regional trains towards Munich as well as to Nuremberg, Regensburg and Prague.

A second tunnel beneath the terminals is currently unused. Originally, there were plans to use it for intercity railway, then for a Transrapid maglev train making the trip to München Hauptbahnhof in 10 minutes. However, this project was cancelled in March 2008 due to cost escalation. Discussions regarding a faster connection between Munich city centre and the airport have fruitlessly taken place for several years, as the journey time of 40–60 minutes faces ongoing criticism. Even a rudimentary express suburban railway service is not in sight.

Regional railway services
As of September 2015, construction works to connect the airport with regional railway services of Deutsche Bahn to and from the north-east had started. This project, called Neufahrner Kurve (Neufahrn curve after the nearby town of Neufahrn bei Freising), saw the existing southwest-bound S-Bahn tracks being expanded with a curve leading to the north, connecting them with the already existing tracks of the Munich-Regensburg line. This new connection enabled hourly regional express train services from Regensburg via Landshut directly to the airport without the need to use a connecting bus coming from the north or to go to Munich city center at first and then backtracking to the airport. The entire project was completed in November 2018. On 9 December 2018, the new hourly service, Flughafenexpress (airport express) between Regensburg and Munich Airport commenced.

Bus
MVV regional bus lines connect the airport to the nearby city of Freising as well as Erding and Markt Schwaben. Lufthansa Airport Bus provides an alternative to the S-Bahn, stopping at Nordfriedhof U-Bahn station and Munich Central Station.

Future

Improvements in public transport
At the beginning of the 1990s, the Deutsche Bundesbahn considered four options for a better railway connection to the airport. At an estimated cost of between 500 million and 2 billion Deutsche Mark, each option would have allowed the airport to be integrated into the ICE network. However, the idea was rejected and instead emphasis was put on a better connection of the airport to regional transportation as well as to Munich main station.

Airport Express (S-Bahn)
After the cancellation of Transrapid proposal, several alternative proposals had been put forward that would utilise the current railway system with minor technical upgrades.

One proposal called "Humpel-Express" would utilise the most of current Munich-Regensburg railway and S1 lines with very limited stops along the route. The biggest issue was frequent level crossing closures at Fasanerie and Feldmoching (total of 39 minutes for every hour), causing the severe traffic congestions. Additionally, the construction of new line between Moosach and Munich Airport would cut through several towns and neighbourhoods, which the residents vehemently opposed. The new line also required the construction of new viaduct over the federal highway B471, increasing the cost further. The opposition from the resident and unwillingness to allot additional funding killed the proposal.

With the Second S-Bahn Tunnel under construction, the proposed Airport Express service will peruse second S-Bahn tunnel upon completion with one stop, instead of four, at Marienhof between Hauptbahnhof and Ostbahnhof. This would reduce the travel time between Hauptbahnhof and Munich Airport to 30 minutes. Additionally, Deutsche Bahn has proposed the underground four-track S-Bahn tunnel from Leuchtenbergring to Halbergmoos S-Bahn stations. This would eliminate the need to slow down before passing through the intervening stations and the need to close the level crossings frequently. If the four-track extension is approved and constructed, the travel time would be reduced further to 15–18 minutes.

Subway
Through the extension of different subway lines to the intersection with one of the two airport suburban railways, the travel time to the airport from different parts of the north of Munich can be considerably reduced. This was realized for the suburbs of Milbertshofen-Am Hart and Feldmoching-Hasenbergl with the subway line  to the  station Feldmoching in 1996 and the construction of the airport connector near Neufahrn in 1998. In 2010, the travel time to the airport from Moosach, Schwabing West and Neuhausen-Nymphenburg districts was shortened by connecting the subway line  to the  station Moosach.

Erdinger ring connections

The Erdinger Ring connection is to extend the S-Bahn (S2) from Erding in the direction of the airport and connect to neighboring Freising through a connecting curve, the Neufahrn Link. It will fulfill the demand of a rail connection between Eastern Bavaria, including the neighboring airport commuter cities Moosburg and Landshut, to the airport, realized with its own regional railway line. A faster connection from the airport to the inner city is not achieved by the Erdinger ring connection, however a direct connection between the airport and the Munich Messe would be. For this, the S2 would also make a short route north of Messe München and have a stop north of the exhibition center.
Already before the opening of the airport there were plans for a regional station at the airport. To this, a railway connection from Mühldorf am Inn is to be made between Erding and Dorfen with the help of the Erdinger ring connection as well as a short new construction single-track called Walpertskirchner Spange. The actual planning phase for this also began, as in the case of the Erdinger ring connection, in August 2006.
On 29 August 2013, the Bavarian Administrative Court rejected the complaints against the plan approval decision of the Neufahrn Link of October 2012 and therefore freed the way for a direct rail connection of the Munich airport from Regensburg, Landshut, Moosburg and Freising. The Neufahrner Kurve is to connect the railway line Landshut-Munich from Neufahr with the railway connection line Neufahr-Flughafen Munich, approximately 2.5 kilometres long, two-track and electrified section of the line. In the construction and financing agreement, signed by rail and free-trade in April 2013, it was agreed that the Neufahrn Link will be built and put into operation by the end of 2018. On 9 December 2018, the new train service to Regensburg and Landshut has commenced.

Third runway
It has been proposed to build a third runway in the airport. It would likely run in parallel to the existing runways and be located to the north-east of the current north runway, significantly extending the total area occupied by the airport.

Justification
According to the airport, the growth of air traffic in Munich from 1997 to 2006 was an average of 7% per year, and the airport's capacity was already exhausted. Since new airlines in Munich no longer received the desired slots, a traffic-spoiling effect occurred. An air traffic forecast of Intraplan Consult GmbH estimated 58.2 million passengers for 2025, provided the airport has a tight-fitting growth. According to Flughafen München GmbH (FMG), the airport's operator, the current two-runway system is already operating at full capacity during peak hours, and requests for additional slots from airlines have been denied. Further increase in air traffic is expected as Munich is to become a second major hub in Germany after Frankfurt.

In order to cope with the potential traffic in Munich, the operator plans to expand today's capacity from 90 movements per hour to 120 movements per hour by constructing a third runway. The shareholders of Flughafen München GmbH (FMG) stated that the construction of a third runway was necessary for the Munich region and for Bavaria as a whole, for reasons of transport and economic policy. Various associations and institutions from economics and politics reacted in favor of the plan approval decision issued by the government of Oberbayern for the construction of a third runway at Munich Airport.

Counterarguments
The project for the construction of a third runway is particularly contentious in the directly affected airport region of the districts of Freising and Erding, but also in other nearby counties.Above all, they question the growth projections presented by FMG, and one district calls for the use of larger aircraft in order to meet demand.

The opponents of the expansion project joined forces to form the action alliance aufgeMUCkt (over 80 groups, including citizens' initiatives, ecclesiastical groups and environmental organizations), supported by, among others, the BUND in Bavaria, that organized many demonstrations. The Catholic Church, which is the owner of some of the affected sites, also announced resistance to the construction. Since the plan approval decision of 26 July 2011, more protests have taken place. On 29 October 2011, a large demonstration with around 7,000 participants took place in Munich in Marienplatz directly in front of the Old Town Hall.

Progress
In August 2007, the airport operator applied for planning permission from the government of Upper Bavaria. More than 60,000 objections have been filed during public display of the plans. The objections and lawsuits against the third runway were later overturned by the Bavarian Administrative Court, allowing for construction plans to proceed.

On 26 July 2011, the government of Upper Bavaria issued the zoning approval for the construction of a third runway. With this decision, the zoning authority, after the intensive examination and consideration of all ramifications, expressly approved the need presented by Flughafen München GmbH and the plans submitted for the third runway. Also tied to the approval by the government of Upper Bavaria is the prompt completion of the construction project. However, the airport operator has chosen to follow the advice of Bavaria's Higher Administrative Court and not to proceed until the principal proceedings concerning the project have reached a conclusion. The decision is currently being reviewed by the court. The building permit associated with the zoning will continue to be valid for up to 15 years.

While according to ICAO Regulations (Annex XIV) the new runway would have to be named 08L/26R (renaming the existing north runway to 08C/26C), it is currently assigned the working title 09/27 in all plans.

In 2015, the airport received approval from Germany's Federal Administrative Court to build a third runway, dismissing all complaints and appeals, and confirming the 2014 decision of Bavaria's Higher Administrative Court to grant approval. The plans include a new  runway northeast of the existing airport and a new satellite building at Terminal 2, the latter of which did open in April 2016. However, construction of the new runway may yet be delayed as the project has to have unanimous approval by the airport's three shareholders: Bavaria, Federal Republic of Germany and the City of Munich. The latter has opposed the plan since a 2012 referendum.

In September 2020, the Bavarian government stopped all progression regarding the third runway until at least 2028 due to the massive decrease of traffic in the wake of the COVID-19 pandemic.

See also
 Memmingen Airport, an airport 110km (68mi) from Munich that serves the city with low-cost flights.
 List of airports in Germany
 Transport in Germany

References

External links

 Official website
 Munich Flight Tracking Live flight tracking at Flightradar24
 
 

Transport in Munich
Airports in Bavaria
Buildings and structures in Munich
Airports established in 1992